Rodrigo Román Villagra (born 14 February 2001) is an Argentine professional footballer who plays as a midfielder for Talleres de Córdoba.

Club career
Villagra came through the youth ranks of Rosario Central. Diego Cocca was the manager who selected him for his professional debut, as the midfielder featured for the full duration of a Copa Libertadores group stage defeat to Libertad on 4 April 2019; he had previously been on the substitutes bench in the same competition a month prior versus Grêmio.

On 5 August 2021, Villagra joined fellow league club Talleres de Córdoba on a deal until the end of 2025.

International career
In March 2019, Villagra received a call-up to the Argentina U20s ahead of friendlies in Murcia, Spain.

Personal life
Villagra has a footballing brother, Cristian, who also started his senior career with Rosario Central. Their other brother, Gonzalo, died in June 2018 following a battle with leukemia.

Career statistics
.

References

External links

2001 births
Living people
Sportspeople from Córdoba Province, Argentina
Argentine footballers
Argentina youth international footballers
Argentina under-20 international footballers
Association football midfielders
Rosario Central footballers
Talleres de Córdoba footballers
Argentine Primera División players